Beverly Hills Cop III: Original Motion Picture Soundtrack is the soundtrack to the 1994 film of the same name. It was released on May 10, 1994, by MCA Records and consisted mostly of R&B music with some rock and hip hop. Like the film, the soundtrack was not well received and only made it to 158 on the Billboard 200 and 66 on the Top R&B/Hip-Hop Albums. Three singles found minor success on the charts, "The Right Kinda Lover" by Patti LaBelle, "Luv 4 Dem Gangsta'z" by Eazy-E, and "The Place Where You Belong" by Shai. The song "Mood" which is performed by Chanté Moore also appears on her second album A Love Supreme. Nile Rodgers also covered Harold Faltermeyer's "Axel F" in a breakbeat hardcore version.

Track listing

Chart history

References

External links

Beverly Hills Cop III (Original Motion Picture Soundtrack) by Various Artists on iTunes

1994 soundtrack albums
MCA Records soundtracks
Contemporary R&B soundtracks
Beverly Hills Cop (franchise)
Albums produced by Jimmy Jam and Terry Lewis
Albums produced by Keith Forsey
Albums produced by Nile Rodgers
Albums produced by Brian Holland
Albums produced by Lamont Dozier
Albums produced by Raphael Saadiq
Hip hop soundtracks
Rock soundtracks
Comedy film soundtracks
Action film soundtracks